Viola sempervirens, known by the common names redwood violet and evergreen violet, is a species in the genus Viola. It is native to the West Coast of the United States and British Columbia, Canada, and grows in closed-cone pine forest, California mixed evergreen forest, redwood forest, and Douglas fir forest communities.
It has leathery purple-spotted green leaves and bright yellow flowers. It blooms in winter and spring.

References

Jepson Manual Treatment
Washington Burke Museum
Photo gallery

sempervirens
Flora of California
Flora of Oregon
Flora of Washington (state)
Flora of British Columbia
Flora without expected TNC conservation status